One Eighth Apache is a 1922 American silent Western film directed by Ben F. Wilson and starring Roy Stewart, Kathleen Kirkham and Wilbur McGaugh.

Cast
 Roy Stewart as Brant Murdock
 Kathleen Kirkham as Norma Biddie
 Wilbur McGaugh as Charlie Longdeer
 George M. Daniel as Tyler Burgess
 Dick La Reno as Joseph Murdock

References

Bibliography
 Munden, Kenneth White. The American Film Institute Catalog of Motion Pictures Produced in the United States, Part 1. University of California Press, 1997.

External links
 

1922 films
1922 Western (genre) films
Silent American Western (genre) films
Films directed by Ben F. Wilson
American silent feature films
1920s English-language films
American black-and-white films
Arrow Film Corporation films
1920s American films